These are the official results of the Men's Discus Throw event at the 1999 World Championships in Seville, Spain. There were a total number of 37 participating athletes, with the final held on Tuesday August 24, 1999.

Medalists

Schedule
All times are Central European Time (UTC+1)

Abbreviations
All results shown are in metres

Qualification
 Held on Tuesday 1999-08-22 with the mark set at 65.00 metres

Final

See also
 1998 Men's European Championships Discus Throw (Budapest)
 2000 Men's Olympic Discus Throw (Sydney)
 2002 Men's European Championships Discus Throw (Munich)

References
 Results
 trackandfieldnews

D
Discus throw at the World Athletics Championships